Alladin and the Wonderful Lamp, also known by its Telugu-language title Allauddin Adhbhuta Deepam, its Tamil-language title Allavudeenum Arputha Vilakkum, and its Hindi-language title Alladdin Ka Chirag, is a 1957 Indian fantasy film produced by M. L. Pathy on Jai Sakthi Pictures banner and directed by T. R. Raghunath. The film stars Akkineni Nageswara Rao, Anjali Devi. It is an adaptation of the story of Aladdin from One Thousand and One Nights and a trilingual, filmed simultaneously in three different languages. Allavudeenum Arputha Vilakkum was released on 29 March 1957, and Allavuddin Adbhuta Deepam followed on 13 April. Alladin Ka Chirag too, came in the same year.

Plot 
Jaffer, a savage warlock, longs to conquer the world. Through his friend Yakub, he learns about a magic lamp that grants any wish by the genie imprisoned inside and it is stationed at Korakaram caves. To achieve it a young & energetic man who holds seven moles on his righthand is required and Jaffer finds out the person is Aladdin. Right now Jaffer makes Yakub dumb also forges a statue as Sitara meets Alladin by purporting as his paternal uncle, and propels Alladin towards the caves. After making an adventurous journey, Alladin achieves the lamp, in his return, Jaffer asks to hand over the lamp to which he refuses, so an angered Jaffer locks him inside the cave and quits. At that time, Alladin uses the magical ring given by Jaffer for emergency and arrives home. Thereafter, he narrates the actuality to his mother Fathima as frightened she throws away the lamp which is buried in their backyard.

Time passes, and Alladin falls for Bagdad Sultan's only daughter Yasmin, one night, he secretly enters the fort but is caught by the soldiers and the Sultan punishes him severely. Looking at her son's pain Fathima approaches Sultan and pleas to couple up Princess with Alladin then Sultan challenges Alladin to gain amass wealth equal to him. At that juncture, Alladin finds the old wonder lamp while Fathima is cleaning it the genie is released and Alladin turns into a big wheel when Sultan lives up to his promise and espousals Alladin & Yasmin. Here, unfortunately, Jaffer discovers that Alladin is alive, so, in a disguised form, he steals the lamp, imprisons Yasmin, and pulls back Alladin's wealth. At present, Alladin moves in search of Yasmin, with the help of Yakub lands at the fort and spots that Jaffer is threatening Yamin to fulfill his lust. Then, trickily Alladin recoups the lamp, eliminates Jaffer, and bounces back to Bagdad. At last, the Sultan handovers the kingdom to Alladin and he sets the genie-free as it may not be misused.

Cast 
Adapted from Film News Anandan's database:
Akkineni Nageswara Rao as Alladin
Anjali Devi as Yasmin
S. V. Ranga Rao as Jaffer
Relangi as Syed
T. S. Balaiah as Yakub
Rajasulochana as Sitara
K. Malathi as Fathima
G. Shakunthala as Roshanara
Master Anand as young Alladin

Soundtrack 
The soundtrack composed by S. Rajeswara Rao & S. Hanumantha Rao.

Production 
The film is an adaptation of the story of Aladdin from One Thousand and One Nights. It was directed by T. R. Raghunath, produced by M. L. Pathy under Jai Sakthi Pictures, and was simultaneously filmed in Tamil as Allavudeenum Arputha Vilakkum, Telugu as Allavuddin Adbhuta Deepam and in Hindi as Alladdin Ka Chirag. Alladin and the Wonderful Lamp was used as the English title for the trilingual. The screenplay was written by Raghunath and V. Srinivasan. Akkineni Nageswara Rao starred as the title character. R. Sampath was the cinematographer, and S. A. Murugesan worked as editor. The sequence of the song "Seladum Neerodai Meethe" and its Telugu version was shot in Gevacolor, as the censor certificate of this film states as partly coloured. The Telugu version marked the first Telugu film to have colour sequence.

Release 
Allavudeenum Arputha Vilakkum was released on 29 March 1957, and Allavuddin Adbhuta Deepam followed on 13 April. Alladin Ka Chirag was released in the same year too.

References

External links 
 
 

1950s fantasy films
1950s Hindi-language films
1950s multilingual films
1950s Tamil-language films
1950s Telugu-language films
1957 films
Films based on Aladdin
Films directed by T. R. Raghunath
Films scored by S. Rajeswara Rao
Films scored by S. Hanumantha Rao
Indian black-and-white films
Indian fantasy films
Indian multilingual films